Fábio Henrique Pena (born August 27, 1990 in Pires do Rio) is a Brazilian professional football player, who last played for Shillong Lajong FC in the I-League.

Playing career
After a season in Mogi Mirim Fabio moved to J2 League club Roasso Kumamoto in 2010. After four seasons in Japan he returned to Brazil in 2014.

After a failed negotiation with Série A club Goiás he signed for another Brazilian club Real Noroeste.

On 31 December 2015 it was announced that Fabio has signed for Indian club Shillong Lajong F.C. for the 2015–16 I-League Season.

References

External links
 

1990 births
Living people
Brazilian footballers
Mogi Mirim Esporte Clube players
J2 League players
Roasso Kumamoto players
I-League players
Shillong Lajong FC players
Brazilian expatriate footballers
Expatriate footballers in Japan
Expatriate footballers in India
Brazilian expatriate sportspeople in Japan
Brazilian expatriate sportspeople in India
Sportspeople from Goiás
Association football forwards